Claudia Brücken (born 7 December 1963) is a German singer and songwriter. She is best known as the lead vocalist of the synth-pop band Propaganda.

In 1996, Brücken started working with Orchestral Manoeuvres in the Dark co-founder Paul Humphreys, first without a name, and from 2004 as Onetwo. In March 2013, Brücken and Humphreys ceased working and living together, and she has subsequently returned to pursuing her solo career.

Early career
At age 14, Brücken joined her first band, Haarsträubend. Her second band was the all-female The Tripolinas together with Susanne Freytag, who also became a member of the band Propaganda.

Propaganda
In 1983, Brücken joined the German band Propaganda and relocated to London when they signed with ZTT Records. Propaganda had two UK top 30 hit singles with "Dr Mabuse" (1984) and "Duel" (1985). On 14 February 1985, Brücken married British music journalist Paul Morley, who was one of the founders of the ZTT label. In July 1985, the first Propaganda album A Secret Wish was released. While promoting their first album and writing songs for a new album, internal tensions rose within the group. This was mainly attributed to the relationship between Brücken and Morley, and the profitless contract the band had signed with ZTT. In 1986, Propaganda left ZTT, and Brücken left Propaganda to stay with ZTT.

Act and solo career
She joined Thomas Leer to form Act, who in 1988 released their only album Laughter, Tears and Rage. In 1991 she released a solo album Love: And a Million Other Things for Island Records. In the United Kingdom two singles were released from this album "Absolut(e)" in 1990, and "Kiss Like Ether" in 1991. Throughout the rest of the 90s, Brücken concentrated mainly on motherhood (she has a daughter, Maddy, and a son, Daniel, with Paul Morley) and made some guest performances on albums of other artists. She had met Paul Humphreys (of OMD) in the early 1980s but it was in 1996 when the pair became close, as she was working on songs for a possible second solo album.

Propaganda reunion

In 1998, Brücken joined the part-reunion of Propaganda (in which founder Ralf Dörper, see also Die Krupps, did not take part) and they began working on new material. Several tracks were completed as demos, including a snippet of a video. A preview of this video was released via the band's official website in early 2000, however, the reunion fell apart and no album materialized, although nine songs were leaked to the internet. Two of these were later released as Onetwo songs: "Cloud Nine", co-written by Martin Gore of Depeche Mode, and "Anonymous". 

The original four-piece including founder Ralf Dörper performed together at the Trevor Horn Prince's Trust extravaganza which took place at the Wembley Arena in 2004. Another attempt at a band reunion failed in 2010.

2000-2018
At the end of 2000, Brücken and Humphreys undertook a short tour of the United States as "Paul Humphreys of OMD: OMD Revisited". The tour started in Salt Lake City, and they performed songs from OMD and Propaganda, but also some new songs they had written. As Onetwo, in June 2004 the pair became the first established artists to release new material exclusively on eBay with a 5-track EP format called Item. Onetwo made their live debut in September 2004 at the Carling Academy at Islington.

A collaboration between Brücken and pianist Andrew Poppy resulted in the album Another Language in 2005. On this album, they performed songs of other artists with just vocals and piano/guitar.

Onetwo finally released their debut album Instead on 26 February 2007, and performed some gigs in April 2007. They also supported Erasure and The Human League in the second half of 2007.

Her vocals can be heard in the hit 2011 video game L.A. Noire, as the singing voice of lounge singer, German immigrant and the main character's love interest Elsa Lichtmann.

In 2011, Brücken released Combined, which contained eight previously released tracks and four new ones, including her duet with Andy Bell of Erasure and two tracks from Onetwo. She also did a duet with Paul Rutherford of Frankie Goes To Hollywood singing "This Is Not America" a song written by David Bowie and Pat Metheny for the soundtrack of the movie The Falcon and the Snowman.

In March 2011, Brücken performed at the Scala, Kings Cross, London. She performed a selection of songs from her work with Propaganda, Act, Andrew Poppy, OneTwo and several numbers from her solo career. She was joined onstage by a variety of guests including Paul Humphreys, Glenn Gregory, Martyn Ware, Andrew Poppy, Susanne Freytag, Ralf Dorper and Andy Bell. The concert was called 'This Time: It's Claudia Brücken'. The concert was recorded and released on 23 July 2012 as a CD/DVD entitled This Happened: Live at the Scala, and was produced by Paul Humphreys and Martin Gooch who also directed.

On 6 November 2012, Brücken released a new CD/vinyl set entitled The Lost Are Found, a collection of "lost" songs from artists such as the Pet Shop Boys, Julee Cruise and The Band, whose second album The Band contains "Whispering Pines" which lends the album its title. A video for "Whispering Pines" was released as the album's first single in December.

Brücken played live in the UK in March 2013. Germany tour dates were postponed after an announcement on 7 March reporting that Paul Humphreys would have to withdraw from the original dates.

In October 2014, Brücken released a new solo album, entitled Where Else... (Cherry Red), a collaboration with co-writer and producer John Williams.

2018 to date: xPropaganda
For two nights in March 2018, Brücken, along with Propaganda bandmate Susanne Freytag, performed the Propaganda album "A Secret Wish" in its entirety at The Garage in London under the name X-Propaganda. By 2021 the duo of Brücken and Freytag decided that their band's name would be now styled as xPropaganda, with the duo recording a new album with producer Stephen Lipson called The Heart Is Strange. In February 2022, Universal Music announced that it would release The Heart Is Strange on the ZTT Label in May, a label the original line-up of Propaganda had signed to in the 1980s. The Heart Is Strange features the tracks "The Night", "Don’t (You Mess With Me)" and "No Ordinary Girl", with xPropaganda scheduled to play it live in 2022, with a line-up including Brücken, Freytag and Lipson.  The album reached #11 on the UK charts, a higher position than the original Propaganda achieved forty years earlier.

Select discography

Citations

External links 

 

1963 births
Living people
People from Neumarkt (district)
German women singers
Women new wave singers
German new wave musicians
German emigrants to England
Island Records artists
Synth-pop new wave musicians